is a Japanese politician from Komeito currently serving as State Minister for Reconstruction.

References 

Living people
1970 births
Komeito politicians
21st-century Japanese politicians
Government ministers of Japan
Members of the House of Councillors (Japan)